2022 FC Tucson season is the twelfth season in the soccer team's history and their fourth in USL League One.

Players and staff

Current roster

Coaching staff

Front Office Staff

Competitions

Friendlies
All times from this point on Mountain Standard Time (UTC-07:00)

USL League One

Standings

Results summary

Match results

U.S. Open Cup

As a member of the USL League One, FC Tucson entered the tournament proper in the Second Round. This was their first appearance in the Open Cup since 2018.

Statistics

One Own Goal scored by Greenville Triumph SC and Union Omaha.

Goalkeepers

References

FC Tucson
FC Tucson
FC Tucson
FC Tucson
FC Tucson seasons
FC Tucson